CryptoBuddy is a simple software application for the encryption and compression of computer files to make them safe and secure. The application uses a 64-bit block cipher algorithm for encryption and a proprietary compression algorithm. The CryptoBuddy software is also used as part of the CryptoStick encryption device from Research Triangle Software, Inc. The software was released for public use on June 12, 2002.

References

2002 software
Cryptographic software